Piazza della Libertà is the northernmost point of the historic centre of Florence. It was created in the 19th century during works to produce the Viali di Circonvallazione around the city. It hosts Triumphal Arch of the Lorraine and, in winter, an ice rink for skating.

History and architecture

A clearing around Porta San Gallo has existed since the fourteenth century and its name has historically been Porta San Gallo Square. In 1738 the square's Triumphal Arch of the Lorraine was erected to celebrate the arrival of the Habsburg-Lorraine dynasty in Florence.

In 1865, the demolition of the medieval walls allowed for a new reshaping of the area by the architect Giuseppe Poggi, completed by 1875 in the present elliptical shape square, surrounded by palaces. In the middle of the tree-lined park is a pool with fountains in front of the triumphal arch.

The square was named Camillo Cavour square, changed in 1930 to Costanzo Ciano square, in 1944 to Muti square, and in the 1945 permanently to Piazza della Libertà or Liberty square.

The Parterre
On the north of the square is present the Parterre of Florence. Here there was a French garden wanted in the 18th century by Granduca Pietro Leopoldo, when Giuseppe Poggi created this square (when Florence was Capital of Kingdom of Italy) didn't modify it, but in 1922 the architect Enrico Fantappié built here the Palace of Exhibition.

Gallery

Liberta